Caridosuctor populosum is an extinct species of coelacanth that lived during the Carboniferous period (Serpukhovian stage, about 318 - 326 million years ago). Fossils have been found in the Bear Gulch lagerstätte in Montana.

References

External links 
 Fossil fishes of Bear Gulch: Caridosuctor populosum

Rhabdodermatidae
Carboniferous bony fish
Mississippian fish of North America
Prehistoric lobe-finned fish genera